The 2006 Minnesota House of Representatives election was held in the U.S. state of Minnesota on November 7, 2006, to elect members to the House of Representatives of the 85th Minnesota Legislature. A primary election was held in several districts on September 12, 2006.

The Minnesota Democratic–Farmer–Labor Party (DFL) won a majority of seats, defeating the Republican Party of Minnesota, which had a majority since defeating the DFL in the 1998 election. The new Legislature convened on January 3, 2007.

Results

See also
 Minnesota Senate election, 2006
 Minnesota gubernatorial election, 2006
 Minnesota elections, 2006

References

External links
 Color shaded map showing winning margin by district (PDF) from 2006 Election Maps, Minnesota Secretary of State

2006 Minnesota elections
Minnesota House of Representatives elections
Minnesota House of Representatives